Scottish Assessors (the Scottish Assessors Association, SSA) is a voluntary, non-statutory association of land valuation assessors and their senior staff in Scotland. The association encourages a consistent approach to the administration of valuation, council tax and electoral registration.

Founded in 1975, in conjunction with the abolition of the Scottish counties, Scottish Assessors is the successor to the Association of Lands Valuation Assessors of Scotland, founded in 1957, and the Association of Lands Valuation Assessors, founded in 1886.

The SAA liaises with the Valuation Office Agency of England and Wales, the Valuation Office (Oifig Luachála) of Ireland, and the Land and Property Service in Northern Ireland.

Assessors
Scottish Assessors are independent public officials who decide the rateable value of property listed on a local valuation roll. They must be members of the Royal Institution of Chartered Surveyors and work under the umbrella body, the Scottish Assessors Association.

References

External links
Official website

Local government in Scotland
Organisations based in Scotland
1975 establishments in Scotland
1975 in British politics
Rates in the United Kingdom
Property taxes
Local taxation in Scotland
Voter registration
Elections in Scotland
Scots property law
Evaluation
Land value taxation
Real estate in the United Kingdom